Stefano Brancaccio (1618–1682) was a Roman Catholic cardinal.

On 1 January 1645, he was consecrated bishop by Francesco Barberini (seniore), Cardinal-Bishop of Porto e Santa Rufina. He served as titular Archbishop and nuncio, then became Archbishop (personal title) of Viterbo and Tuscany.  In 1681, he concurrently became Cardinal.

Episcopal succession

References

1618 births
1682 deaths
17th-century Italian cardinals
Apostolic Nuncios to the Republic of Venice
Apostolic Nuncios to the Republic of Florence